Saigou Dam  is a gravity dam located in Miyazaki Prefecture in Japan. The dam is used for power production. The catchment area of the dam is 647.8 km2. The dam impounds about 40  ha of land when full and can store 2452 thousand cubic meters of water. The construction of the dam was started on 2011 and completed in 2018.

See also
List of dams in Japan

References

Dams in Miyazaki Prefecture